The William D. Bloxham Plantation was a small cotton plantation of  located southwest of Tallahassee, Leon County, Florida, United States, established by William D. Bloxham.

Plantation specifics
The Leon County Florida 1860 Agricultural Census shows that the William D. Bloxam Plantation had the following:
 Improved Land: 
 Unimproved Land: 
 Cash value of plantation: $7000
 Cash value of farm implements/machinery: $765
 Cash value of farm animals: $1500
 Number of slaves: 52
 Bushels of corn: 2500
 Bales of cotton: 100

The owner
William Bloxham was born July 9, 1835, in Florida and was listed as 24 years old in 1860. Bloxham served as Florida's governor from 1881 through 1885. He again served as governor from 1897 through 1901. Bloxham died March 15, 1911.
In 1884 William D. Bloxam plantation was sold to Charles J. F. Allen of Louisville, KY for $8241.

Reconstruction
William D. Bloxham was one of the first, if not the first, to abandon cotton in 1879 in favor of intensive farming. Bloxam had $2275 worth of livestock in 1879.

References
Rootsweb Plantations
Largest Slaveholders from 1860 Slave Census Schedules
Paisley, Clifton; From Cotton To Quail, University of Florida Press, c1968.

Plantations in Leon County, Florida
Cotton plantations in Florida